Holaspis is a genus of equatorial African lizards in the family Lacertidae. These lizards are capable of gliding flight for distances of 30 meters (98 feet).

Etymology
The New Latin word "Holaspis " is derived from the Greek words " aspis", ἀσπίς (= a buckler, or round shield) and " holos", ὅλος, ὅλως (= whole, all, complete). It refers to the head scalation with frontoparietal and occipital scales all fused.

Description
In morphology-based parsimony and compatibility analyses Arnold (1989) recognized a clade called the "Equatorial African group" including Adolfus, Gastropholis, and Holaspis. In all lacertids of this clade the parietal foramen is consistently absent, the parietal scale extends to the edge of the parietal table, and the postnasal scale is single.
In Holaspis the head and body are very depressed, frontoparietal and occipital scales are all fused to shields, the tail is depressed with lateral fringes of scales, and the third and fourth toes of the forefoot are fused for nearly their entire joint. There are two longitudinal rows of smooth broad band-like scales down the vertebral line of the back and on the tail. The ventral scales are smooth.
The collar is composed of 9 to 15 small scales. 16 to 24 femoral pores are present, more developed in males. There is no sexual dimorphism in SVL, but males have larger heads and their tail base is wider.

Dorsally the ground colour is black. On the head from the tip of the snout to the nape of the neck there is a yellow to yellow greenish median line. On each side of the  back outside the large dorsal scales there runs a turquoise to sky blue longitudinal stripe which fuses on the tail base. From there it travels as a clear blue stripe partly interrupted onto the tip of the tail. 
The pattern of the flanks differs in the two species: In H. guentheri there are two yellowish brown to greyish lines on the flanks while in H. laevis there runs only one broader yellowish brown to red brown or usually beige stripe from the tip of the snout to the hind limb. The wide tail scales on the sides are yellow to orange-coloured.

The number of light or dark stripes is the only known external morphological difference between the two species. As Arnold (1989) wrote:
H. guentheri: "A dark vertebral stripe on body and three dark stripes on each side".
H. laevis: "A dark vertebral stripe and two dark stripes on each side".

Ventrally the lizards are coloured yellow or orange to greenish-orange, partly with a mother-of-pearl shimmer. Males are often more brightly coloured. Juveniles resemble their parents but the coloured dorsal stripes are narrower and less intensely coloured. Ventrally the juveniles are pitch-black in contrast to the adults.

Habitat and natural history
Holaspis are diurnal, arboreal, extremely agil lacertids and able to move on vertical and overhanging surfaces with body and tail pressed closely to the surface. The serrated tail is considered as an additional tree climbing adaption to increase grip.

They are active hunters of small  insects and other arthropods like ants, grasshoppers and spiders, often investigating crevices in which they also frequently hide.

Not much is known about the reproduction in nature. More than one clutch/year is produced. Females lay two eggs under loose bark or in leaf litter. Specimen from northeastern Democratic Republic of Congo laid eggs in June and females from Nyasaland caught on 3 August held two well developed eggs.

Flight
The species of Holaspis are unique among lacertids in being capable of gliding flight between trees up to 30 m distance. Adaptions for gliding are the flat body and tail, the fused fingers and their low body mass. Their bones are packed full of air spaces, making the lizard's skeleton feather light for gliding.

They are less specialized for flight than species of the agamid genus Draco or gekkonid genus Ptychozoon.

Vivarium keeping
Holaspis species are occasionally kept as pets. But Holaspis guentheri and H. laevis are often confused in pet trade or generally named H. guentheri because H. laevis was formerly only a subspecies of H. guentheri. Nearly all Holaspis in the pet trade are H. laevis. For discrimination of the two species see "Description". Captive breeding resulted in an increase of information on the biology of Holaspis.

Species
Two species are recognized as being valid. Formerly H. laevis was a subspecies of H. guentheri.
Holaspis guentheri Gray, 1863 - western neon blue-tailed tree lizard
Holaspis laevis F. Werner, 1895 - eastern neon blue-tailed tree lizard

References

Further reading
Arnold EN (1989). "Systematics and adaptive radiation of Equatorial African lizards assigned to the genera Adolfus, Bedriagaia, Gastropholis, Holaspis and Lacerta (Reptilia: Lacertidae)". Journal of Natural History 23: 525-555.
Arnold EN (2002). "Holaspis, a lizard that glided by accident: mosaics of cooption and adaptation in a tropical forest lacertid (Reptilia, Lacertidae)". Bulletin of the Natural History Museum, London (Zoology) 68: 155-162.
Boulenger GA (1921). [https://archive.org/stream/monographoflacer02boul#page/n3/mode/2up Monograph of the Lacertidae. Vol. II]. London: British Museum (Natural History), Department of Zoology. 451 pp.
Broadley DG (2000). "Lacertidae – Holaspis laevis (Werner, 1895). Eastern Serrate-Toed Tree lizard". African Herp News 31: 13-14.
Chirio L, Ineich I (2006). "Biogeography of the reptiles of the Central African Republic". African Journal of Herpetology 55 (1): 23-59.
Dunger GT (1967). "The Lizards and Snakes of Nigeria. Part II: The Lacertids of Nigeria". Nigerian Field 32 (3): 117-131.
Gray JE (1863). "Descriptions of Two New Genera of Lizards (Holaspis and Poriodogaster A. Smith MS)". Proceedings of the Zoological Society of London 1863: 152-155 + Plates XX-XXI. (Holaspis guentheri, new species, p. 153 + Plate XX, figure 1).
Greenbaum E, Villanueva CO, Kusamba C, Aristote MM, Branch WR (2011). "A molecular phylogeny of Equatorial African Lacertidae, with the description of a new genus and species from eastern Democratic Republic of the Congo". Zoological Journal of the Linnean Society 163: 913–942.
Herrmann H-W (1998). "Holaspis guentheri laevis (East African fringe-tailed Forest Lizard). Reproduction". Herpetological Review 29: 238.
Hoinsoude Segniagbeto G, Trape J-F, Afiademanyo KM, Rödel M-O, Ohler A, Dubois A, David P, Meirte D, Glitho IA, Petrozzi F, Luiselli L (2015). "Checklist of the lizards of Togo (West Africa), with comments on systematics, distribution, ecology, and conservation". Zoosystema 37 (2): 381-402.
Kroniger, M. (1998) -  ″Protokoll einer Paarung bei Holaspis guentheri laevis WERNER, 1895.″ - Die Eidechse, Bonn/Bremen, 9 (1): 41-42. 
Kroniger, M. (1998) ″Haltung und Nachzucht von Holaspis guentheri laevis WERNER, 1895.″ -  ′′Die Eidechse, Bonn,′′ ′′′9′′′ (3): 82-90.  
Kroniger M (2004). "Die Ostafrikanische Sägeschwanzeidechse Holaspis laevis".  Art für Art, Münster (NTV). p. 61. (in German).
Kroniger M, Bosch HAJ in den (2001). "Biological data on Holaspis guentheri laevis Werner, 1895 obtained from vivarium keeping". Pod@rcis 2 (3): 72-80.
LeBreton M (1999). A working checklist of the herpetofauna of Cameroon. Amsterdam: IUCN Netherlands. 141 pp.
Loveridge A (1953). "Reptiles from Nyasaland and Tete". Bulletin of the Museum of Comparative Zoology at Harvard College 110: 143-322.
Meyer M (2000). "Die „Fliegende Eidechse“. Haltung und Vermehrung von Holaspis guentheri laevis". Reptilia, Münster 5 (26): 55-57.
Pauwels OSG, Itam S (2013). "Holaspis guentheri (Günther’s Gliding Lizard). Predation". Herpetological Review 44 (4): 674.
Schiøtz A, & Volsøe H (1959). "The gliding flight of Holaspis guentheri, a West African lacertid". Copeia 1959: 259-260.
Schmidt KP (1919). "Contributions to the herpetology of the Belgian Congo based on the collection of the American Congo Expedition, 1909-1915. Pt. I. Turtles, crocodiles, lizards, and chameleons". Bulletin of the American Museum of Natural History 39 (2): 385–624.
Spawls S, Howell KM, Drewes RC, Ashe J (2002). A Field Guide to the Reptiles of East Africa. San Diego, San Francisco, New York, Boston, London: Academic Press, Elsevier Science. 544 pp.
Vanhooydonck B, Meulepas G, Herrel A, Boistel R, Tafforeau P, Fernandez V, Aerts P (2009). "Ecomorphological analysis of aerial performance in a non-specialized lacertid lizard, Holaspis guentheri ". The Journal of Experimental Biology 212: 2475-2482.
Werner F (1895). "Ueber einige Reptilien aus Usambara (Deutsch-Ostafrika)". Verhandl. der k. k. zool. bot. Ges. 45: 190-194 + Plate V. (Holaspis guentheri laevis, new subspecies, p. 191 + Plate 5, figures 4a, 4b, 4b [sic], 4c, 4d). (in German).

 
Gliding animals
Lizard genera
Taxa named by John Edward Gray